Exapate is a Palearctic genus of moths belonging to the subfamily Tortricinae of the family Tortricidae.

The Exapate is a moth commonly found in Britain with a preference for moorland in the northern regions. It has a wingspan of 18–22 mm with the males having elongated forewings. It is commonly found from October into December.

Species
Exapate bicuspidella Bruun & Krogerus, 1996
Exapate congelatella (Clerck, 1759) North Europe, Central Europe
Exapate duratella Heyden, 1864 South Europe

See also
List of Tortricidae genera

References

External links
tortricidae.com

Tortricidae genera